Shunk is a surname. Notable people with the surname include:

Adam Shunk (born 1979), American high jumper
Francis R. Shunk (1788–1848), Governor of Pennsylvania from 1845 to 1848
Harry Shunk (1924–2006), German photographer

See also
Hunk (nickname)